George Barber (1860 – 10 April 1932) was a member of the Queensland Legislative Assembly.

Biography
Barber was born in Hoo, Kent, the son of George Barber Snr. and his wife Fanny (née Parker). After his arrival in Charleville he was a builder.

Barber was twice married, firstly to Florence Gifford whom he married in Canterbury, England, and together had 6 sons and 4 daughters. Florence died in 1922 and the next year he married Mary Ann Toub. Barber died in April 1932 and was buried in the Charleville Cemetery.

Public career
Barber won the seat of Warrego for the Labour Party at the 1907 Queensland state election, defeating the sitting member, Patrick Leahy. Leahy appealed the result based on the fact that Barber was insolvent and the Elections Judge reversed the result and installed Leahy as the member.

References

Members of the Queensland Legislative Assembly
1860 births
1932 deaths
Australian Labor Party members of the Parliament of Queensland